The Three-Cushion World Cup is an international tournament series in three-cushion billiards, which is held every year since 1986 between three and ten times a year.

History 
The World Cup was founded in 1985 by German Werner Bayer, a carom billiards enthusiast and patron. He called the association "Billiards World Cup Association" (BWA) and in 1986 the first tournament was held in Paris. As a patron he had excellent contact to sponsors, and quickly the tournament grew into a popular meeting place for players and spectators. At the time, the World-Cup had one of the highest monetary prizes. Between 1986 and 1989, the prize money per tournament was approximately  DM, with the winner receiving  DM. The BWA organized the World-Cup along with the world governing body, the Union Mondiale de Billard (UMB).

Between 1988 and 1993, the UMB no longer hosted any world championships themselves, therefore, for four years, the BWA World-Cup became the default world championship. In 1994 there were disagreements between the two associations. The UMB thus blocked players, including players wives, referees and organizers who took part in the World Cup, from participating in the tournaments of the UMB and CEB (Confédération Européenne de Billard). Thus, between 1994 and 1997, there were two parallel World-Cup championships. The BWA, as usual, played for 3rd place (the only exception was the tournament 1997/7 ), whereas the UMB did not, and therefore had two 3rd-place finishers. (With few exceptions, since the acquisition of the tournament in 1999, this is the rule up to now) .

After settling the disputes, the UMB and the BWA led the tournament together until early 1999 (Berlin Cup). After 1999, Mr. Bayer withdrew from the BWA for health reasons, and the UMB took over the organization of the tournament series from then on and the BWA broke up due to succession problems.

From 1994, the UMB tournaments were organized in collaboration with the European member association “Confédération Européenne de Billard” (CEB). Since 2004, the World-Cup has been organized as UMB/CEB (in Europe), UMB/CPB (in America), UMB/(in Amerika), UMB/ACBC World-Cup (in Asia), and since 2014, as UMB/ACC in Africa. The prize money amounts to approximately  € per tournament. The prize money has been €106,500 per tournament since 2018.

The individual results of the World Cup 1997/1 were lost directly following the tournament and, up to now, have been unable to be reconstructed, even through research by the well-known billiards archivists Heinrich Weingartner and Dieter Haase (both editors of the three-volume "Encyclopedia of Billiards Sports").

In 2012, only three tournaments were held for the overall winner appointment, instead of the required four, thus the year remains the first year without a title award. On 26 January 2013 it was announced that the Greek shipping magnate, Thanos Athanasiou, until 1995 a player himself, would finance a total of five tournaments in the coming three years. These include the three World-Cup tournaments until 2015, as well as the Junior World Championships in 2013 and the Women's World-Cup in 2014. All tournaments will be played in Athens.

Media Report Transmission 
Until the 2019/20 season, the French billiards portal Kozoom broadcast all UMB tournaments on the Internet and some of them were also taken over by the national broadcasters that hosted them. From the 2021/22 season, this task will be taken over by the Korean partner of Kozoom Five&Six.

Modus 
Initially, the game was played in a set system of up to 15 points, with two winning sets to be completed in the qualification and then three winning sets in the final round. In 2013 they switched to the points system, with up to 30 points being played in the qualification and up to 40 points in the final round. At the change of season in 2019, the first final round will also be held as a group round (8 ×) of 4 players each.

Records 
 Torbjörn Blomdahl is record winner with 45 single and 11 total victories.
 The best general average (GA) was achieved by Daniel Sánchez with 2,777 points (1. April 2017 in Luxor). This is a new official world record.
 The best single average (SA) was achieved by Semih Sayginer in La Baule (27. Oktober 2018) with 6,666 points (40 points in 6 runs). 
 Since 2013, The highest run (HR) at a World-Cup tournament is 24 points, established by Jérémy Bury in Guri, South Korea (7. September 2013). Bury ended the game, which was set at 40 points, with a final series of 24, thus ending the game not by mistake, but by reaching the game target. Likewise 24 Points reached Cho Myung-woo (15. November 2018) and Dick Jaspers (25. Oktober 2019).
 One set, 15 points, in one run in a World-Cup tournament (which until 2012 was also the highest series) was achieved so far by:
 Nobuaki Kobayashi (Valkenburg 1986)
 Torbjörn Blomdahl (Gent 1991, Istanbul 1995)
 Marco Zanetti (Halle 1997, Antwerp 2004, Sluiskil 2007, Alcalá de Guadaira 2008)
 Semih Saygıner (Antwerp 1997)
 Eddy Leppens (Oosterhout 1998)
 Raymond Ceulemans (Oosterhout 1999)
 Frédéric Caudron (Sevilla 2004, Hurghada 2007)
 Daniel Sánchez (Sevilla 2004, Hurghada 2009, Antalya 2012)
 Dick Jaspers (Sluiskil 2005)
 Peter de Backer (Barendrecht 2005)
 Choi Jae-dong (Barendrecht 2005)
 Jérémy Bury (Hurghada 2006, Antalya 2009)
 Kim Kyung-roul (Hurghada 2009, Hurghada 2011)
 Kim Bong-soo (Suwon 2010)
 Murat Naci Coklu (Hurghada 2010)
 Antonio Ortiz Torrent (Suwon 2011)
 Dave Christiani (Vienna 2011)

Prize money and ranking points 

Date of issue: 20 December 2017

Tournament records timeline 
With the set system, the best individual average (SA) is only counted in the game with 3 winning sets. This also applies to the GA, where at least five games must be played. Since the maximum streak of 15 points was achieved a total of 42 times in the days of the set system, players who have reached this number of points several times are only mentioned with their first streak. The numbers in brackets indicate the frequency.

Statistics 
 The  (GA) refers respectively to the entire tournament.
Colour key

World Cup overall champions

List of World Cup single event winners

The best Worldcup-Players (by Ranking-Points) 
Date: 5. March 2023

Annotation 1: WRP: Are the world ranking points (formerly only ranking points) (also the points from the qualification)
Annotation 2: GA: Only the results of the final round were counted

Notes

References 

 

Three-cushion billiards competitions
Recurring sporting events established in 1986
1986 establishments in France